China Beijing International Mining Exchange (CBMX) is an electronic transaction bourse and platform for mineral rights transactions in China. It handles transactions for both State-owned enterprises SOEs as well as transfers of enterprise-owned mineral rights.

Background
The CBMX was established in 2009 and officially began trading operations in October 2010. It is one of twelve subsidiaries of CBEX that conduct trading operations. Appointed by the Beijing Municipal Bureau of Land and Resources, it is described as "a public service platform for international trade of mineral rights and mineral commodities". CBMX claims to be the first such institute receiving governmental approval, the first such institute in China with an electronic platform for transactions of mineral rights, the first to develop a comprehensive handbook (2009), the Mineral Rights Exchange Guidebook, and the first such institute to launch an independent expert assessment system.

The CBMX is physically located in the Fortune Times Building, 3rd floor, in Xicheng District, Beijing in Financial Street. The CBMX has a trading room with computer terminals for 'members' in the middle and 'traders' on either side, and a large red LED display board at the front of the room.

Information on the system is mainly in Chinese and only a small amount of English content is provided. CBMX provides flowcharts showing  the transaction processes for both transfer of State-owned mineral rights and transfer of mineral rights owned by enterprises.

Mission

The CBMX Chairman, Mr. Wu Ruchuan, describes the CBMX principles as:
 conducting operations with integrity in an open and transparent manner
 creating an open, orderly, sound and unified market environment in which all market subjects can compete on an equal footing, and
 promoting the efficiency of mineral rights transactions

The core business of the CBMX is to conduct transactions of mineral rights and the trading of mineral commodities according to the laws, policies and statutes applicable to mineral resources.

The CBMX also  supplies comprehensive services jointly to owners of mineral rights and potential investors comprising:
 project information disclosure
 project promotion
 technical support
 policy consultation
 investment guidance
 M&A planning
 project financing
 risk management
 geological survey and reporting
 exploration development
 trading of mineral commodity items and quantities

CBMX has not yet (May 2011) reported the number of transactions nor their aggregate value since it opened in October 2010.

See also
China's Go Global Strategy

References

Notes

External links
CBMX Official Website
CBEX Official Website

Mining in China
2009 establishments in China